Georges Al Rassi (29 January 1980 – 27 August 2022) was a Lebanese actor, singer, model, musician, and songwriter born into a distinctively artistic family.

Biography
His father, Khalil, played the oud, and his sisters including Nadine and Sandrine acted and sang. At 16 years old, Georges Al Rassi won his first contract: a six months agreement to perform at Options, the international nightclub, in Kaslik, Lebanon. On 27 August 2022, he died from a car accident at Masnaa Border Crossing along with a female companion, Zeina Al-Meraabi, while returning back to his country from Syria.

He was married to Joelle Hatem with whom he had a son, Joe.

Discography 
Albums
 1996: Sahr al Layl
 1998: Hikaya
 2000: Jay Te' Tezer
 2001: Wala Yomken
 2002: Sibt el Hadaf
 2003: Kif Awsefak
 2011: Hamdellah Aal Salama (mini album)

Singles
 2016: Wahdik Enti
 2004: Kif Mfareqna
 2005: Andek Shek
 2006: Inta El Hob
 2007: El Hob El Majnoun
 2008: Laayonak Habibi
 2009: Men Yom Hawak (Albi Mat)
 2010: Inta Ekhtyari
 2012: Temrou Tetghandar
 2013: Jayi La'andek
 2013: Min Allak

Videography

References

External links
 
 

1980 births
2022 deaths 
Road incident deaths in Lebanon 
Road incident deaths in Syria
20th-century Lebanese male singers
21st-century Lebanese male singers
People from Akkar Governorate
Lebanese Christians
Lebanese people of Syrian descent
Lebanese male film actors
Lebanese male television actors